Climaciaceae is a family of mosses belonging to the order Hypnales.

Genera:
 Climacium F. Weber & D.M.H. Mohr in D.M.H. Mohr, 1803
 Pterobryon Hornschuch in C.F.P. Martius, 1840
 Girgensohnia (S.O. Lindberg) Kindberg, 1896

References

Hypnales
Moss families